Deniz Depboylu (born 6 June 1968) is a Turkish serving as the Nationalist Movement Party's vice-president. She also served as a Member of Parliament for Aydın, from the November 2015 elections until she lost her seat in the 2018 election.

Early career
Depboylu was elected as a member of the Nazilli Municipality Council in the 2014 Turkish local elections, and subsequently served as deputy chair of the council.

Political career
Depboylu contested the June 2015 elections on the MHP list for Aydın. Being placed 4th on the list she was not elected to parliament.
Depboylu ran again in the snap November 2015 elections, this time being placed first on the MHP party lists, she was elected to parliament. She was defeated in the 2018 elections.

See also
26th Parliament of Turkey

References

External links
 MP profile on the Grand National Assembly website
 Collection of all relevant news items at Haberler.com

Living people
1968 births

Deputies of Aydın
Members of the 26th Parliament of Turkey
People from Aydın
Nationalist Movement Party politicians